Junonia westermanni, the blue spot pansy,  is a butterfly of the family Nymphalidae. It is found in the central part of the Afrotropical realm.

Its wingspan is about 25 mm.

The larvae feed on Asystasia, Brillantaisia, Barleria, Justicia, Eremomastax, Ruellia, and Pupalia.

Subspecies
J. w. westermanni — Ivory Coast to Angola, Zaire, south-western Ethiopia
J. w. suffusa (Rothschild & Jordan, 1903) — western Uganda to Kenya
J. w. splendens (Schmidt, 1921) — eastern Tanzania, from the Usambara Mountains to Lindi

References

westermanni
Butterflies of Africa
Butterflies described in 1870
Taxa named by John O. Westwood